The 2006 Coca-Cola GM was the 36th edition of the Greenlandic Men's Football Championship. The final round was held in Sisimiut from August 7 to 12. It was won by Nagdlunguaq-48 for the ninth time in its history.

Qualifying stage

North Greenland

Disko Bay
Nagdlunguaq-48 and G-44 Qeqertarsuaq qualified for the final Round.

Central Greenland
B-67 Nuuk qualified for the final Round.

NB Siumut Amerdlok Kunuk qualified for the final Round as hosts.

East Greenland
A.T.A.-60 qualified for the final Round.

South Greenland
Narsaq-85 and Kissaviarsuk-33 qualified for the final Round.

Final round

Pool 1

Pool 2

Playoffs

Semi-finals

Seventh-place match

Fifth-place match

Third place match

Final

See also
Football in Greenland
Football Association of Greenland
Greenland national football team
Greenlandic Men's Football Championship

References

Greenlandic Men's Football Championship seasons
Green
Green
Foot